Washburn is a village mostly in Woodford County, with a small northerly portion in Marshall County, Illinois, United States. The population was 1,032 at the 2020 census. It is part of the Peoria Metropolitan Statistical Area.

Geography
Washburn is an agricultural community in north-central Illinois. It is located in northern Woodford County at  (40.9174,-89.2915), with a small portion extending north into Marshall County. Illinois Route 89 forms the main north–south road through Washburn as Jefferson Street; it leads southwest  to Metamora and northeast  to Varna.

Snag Creek flows through the village, running west to the Illinois River near Chillicothe.

Demographics

As of the census of 2000, there were 1,147 people, 436 households, and 309 families residing in the village. The racial makeup of the village was 97.38% White, 0.17% African American, 0.09% Native American, 0.17% Asian, 0.35% from other races, and 1.83% from two or more races. Hispanic or Latino of any race were 0.70% of the population.

There were 436 households, out of which 34.2% had children under the age of 18 living with them, 60.8% were married couples living together, 6.4% had a female householder with no husband present, and 28.9% were non-families. 25.2% of all households were made up of individuals, and 13.5% had someone living alone who was 65 years of age or older. The average household size was 2.63 and the average family size was 3.16.

In the village, the population was spread out, with 27.7% under the age of 18, 10.0% from 18 to 24, 28.4% from 25 to 44, 18.3% from 45 to 64, and 15.5% who were 65 years of age or older. The median age was 35 years. For every 100 females, there were 99.1 males. For every 100 females age 18 and over, there were 94.1 males.

The median income for a household in the village was $44,167, and the median income for a family was $50,385. Males had a median income of $35,096 versus $22,188 for females. The per capita income for the village was $17,619. About 4.8% of families and 8.4% of the population were below the poverty line, including 14.9% of those under age 18 and 8.1% of those age 65 or over.

Notable people

 Bob Barnes, pitcher with the Chicago White Sox
 James Frank Duryea, built and road-tested America's first gasoline-powered car]
 Clifford C. Ireland, U.S. congressman, 1917–1923
 George Henry Lesch, CEO of Colgate-Palmolive (1960–1971)

References

External links
 
 Village of Washburn/Lowpoint school website

Villages in Marshall County, Illinois
Peoria metropolitan area, Illinois
Villages in Illinois
Villages in Woodford County, Illinois